Cedar Girls Secondary School is a government autonomous girls secondary school in Singapore. Established in 1957, it initially offered only a four-year Express course leading to the Singapore-Cambridge GCE Ordinary Level examinations. Starting in 2012, it has partnered with Victoria Junior College to offer a six-year Integrated Programme, which allows students to proceed to Victoria for 5 Years and 6 years to take the Singapore-Cambridge GCE Advanced Level examinations at the end of 6 Years .

History

Cedar Girls' Secondary School was founded as school with a pioneer batch of 507 students in 1957. The pioneer batch consisted of girls from the Bartley, Beatty and Siglap schools as a result of the government making all schools single-sex that year.

In the 1960s, the school became well known for its performance in track and field, as well as for producing several national athletes. In 1972, athletic facilities were constructed in the school compound at a cost of S$250,000. By doing so, it became the first school in Singapore to have sports amenities on campus. In 1981, the school became one of the first 16 schools in Singapore to have computer appreciation as an extra-curricular activity. From 1989 to 1994, the school was torn down and rebuilt as part of the modernisation of the curriculum. The school went single session in 1992 and gained autonomous status in 1996. In 2004, the school was classified as a band one school for its consistent academic performance.

PRIME
On 14 February 2007, the Ministry of Education announced that under the programme PRIME Phase 9, eight more schools will be upgraded from 2008 to 2010, which included Cedar Girls' Secondary School.

Cedar Girls' Secondary School moved to a holding site at 3 Geylang Bahru Lane from December 2007 to December 2009 during the upgrading. The holding site was formerly the site of Victoria School from 1984 to May 2003. Cedar Girls' Secondary School moved back to its present site and started the new academic year in 2010 at the new building.

Identity and culture

Crest
The school badge consists of four colours – gold, grey, green and blue – with the school motto at the bottom of the badge. These represent excellence, a balance of heart and mind and the outside environment respectively. These colours in turn represent the brilliant but balanced nature of the school.

Motto
The school motto "Honesty, Perseverance, Courtesy" states the traits that are important to develop one's character.

Attire
The school uniform consists of a blue shirt, a grey skirt, white socks and white shoes with a small logo allowed in school colours. For PE lessons, students can wear the yellow PE T-shirt with the grey PE shorts.

Academic information
The school offers a four-year Express course leading up to the Singapore-Cambridge GCE Ordinary Level examinations, as well as a six-year Integrated Programme under the Victoria-Cedar Alliance (VCA).

Victoria-Cedar Alliance Integrated Programme (VCA IP)
The Victoria-Cedar Alliance Integrated Programme is a six-year Integrated Programme which allows students to skip the Singapore-Cambridge GCE Ordinary Level examinations that Express stream students take at the end of Secondary Four. Cedar Girls' Secondary School started offering the Integrated Programme with Victoria School and Victoria Junior College from 2012, building upon the success of the four-year Victoria Integrated Programme (VIP) started by Victoria Junior College in 2005. Under the Integrated Programme, Cedar students complete their four-year secondary education in Cedar Girls' Secondary School before joining Victoria Junior College in Years 5 and 6 and take the Singapore-Cambridge GCE Advanced Level examinations at the end of Year 6.

Character and leadership education

Student Leadership Board

Prefectorial Board
The Prefectorial Board is the highest student leadership board in Cedar Girls' Secondary School. Nominated by teachers and the entire student population, Prefect Councillors are students who are exemplary in conduct, have a positive attitude and demonstrate leadership potential. Besides upholding the high standard of discipline within the school, this board also leads the entire Cedar community in many ways such as major school events and represents the school at important functions.

Peer Support Leaders Board
The Peer Support Leaders Board looks into the well-being of the student body. Nominated by teachers and the student body, PSLs are selected based on their qualities such as integrity, being able to relate well with others and demonstrating an interest in community bonding. Charged with running Sec One Orientation and Peer Support Group Meetings, PSLs together with the Prefectorial Board plan and organise many school functions to bring all Cedarians together.

Monitress Council
The Monitress Council is a student body made up of class monitresses who were elected by their respective classes. This council aims to support the monitress in strengthening class unity and extending their influence towards the student population.

Sports and Health Leaders Board
The Sports and Health Leaders Board (SHLB) is in charge of organizing outdoor as well as sports and health activities in school. Their purpose is to promote an active and healthy lifestyle to the school community and to facilitate team bonding and camaraderie among students and even teachers. The board, previously known separately as the Outdoor Adventure Leaders Board and the Sports Leaders Board, was combined to form a singular leadership board.

Co-curricular activities
The school offers a total of 21 co-curricular activities (CCAs), including physical sports, performing arts, clubs and societies and uniformed groups. Several of these groups have done well for the school in outside competitions.

The school is renowned for excelling in track and field, and has attained 40 "B" and "C" Division titles in the National Inter-School Track And Field Championships since 1968. The school's table tennis team has also excelled, being in the top 10 for both the East Zone and National Inter-school Table Tennis Championships' "B" and "C" Divisions.

The school's uniformed groups have also done very well, with its National Police Cadet Corps unit having attained Gold in the Unit Overall Proficiency Award for 13 years straight from 2000 to 2013. The school's two Girl Guide companies have also attained Gold for the Puan Noor Aishah Award since 2011.

The CCAs offered in the school are as follows:

Physical sports
 Badminton
 Basketball
 Cross Country
 Netball
 Table Tennis
 Track and Field
 Volleyball

Uniformed groups
 Girl Guides
 National Cadet Corps (Land)
 National Police Cadet Corps
 Red Cross

Visual and performing arts
 Choir
 Guzheng Ensemble
 Handbell Ensemble
 Modern Dance
 Symphonic Band

Clubs and societies
 Chinese Language Literacy, Drama and Debate Society
 English Language Literacy, Drama and Debate Society
 Indian Language Literacy, Drama and Debate Society
 Malay Language Literacy, Drama and Debate Society
 Environment Club
 Infocomm Club
 AV and Photography

Notable alumni
 Annette Lee, actress, scriptwriter and singer-songwriter
 Anthea Ong, former Nominated Member of Parliament
 Jacelyn Tay, former actress
 Xiaohan, Mandopop lyricist
 Rachel Yang, Singapore's record holder for pole vaulting

References

External links
 Official website

Toa Payoh
Secondary schools in Singapore
Autonomous schools in Singapore
Girls' schools in Singapore
Schools offering Integrated Programme in Singapore
Cedar Girls' Secondary School alumni
Educational institutions established in 1957
1957 establishments in Malaya
Schools in Central Region, Singapore